Hymie Maxwell Gill (born 4 August 1973, in Dunedin) is a retired hockey player from New Zealand, who was a regular member of the men's national team, nicknamed The Black Sticks, during the late 1990s and early 2000s. Gill earned a total number of 79 caps during his career scoring 7 goals.

References

1973 births
Living people
New Zealand male field hockey players
Field hockey players at the 1998 Commonwealth Games
1998 Men's Hockey World Cup players
2002 Men's Hockey World Cup players
Sportspeople from Dunedin
Commonwealth Games competitors for New Zealand
20th-century New Zealand people
21st-century New Zealand people